Weeds was the second album by Brewer & Shipley and was released in 1969. The album was recorded at Golden State Recorders in San Francisco and produced by Nick Gravenites using the pseudonym "Nicky Gravy".  Gravenites assembled a group of highly respected musicians for the album recording sessions, including guitarist Mike Bloomfield, bassist John Kahn, pedal steel guitarist Red Rhodes, violinist Richard Greene and keyboardists Mark Naftalin and Nicky Hopkins.

The final track, "Witchi-Tai-To," in particular, received a lot of FM radio play, contributing to the album's modest success. The duo gained a devoted underground following as a result of this exposure, which also prepared them for the commercial success of their upcoming album release.

Weeds has been reissued on CD twice, both times coupled with Brewer & Shipley's third album Tarkio, firstly by Collector's Choice records in 2004 and then by Acadia Records in 2008.

Track listing
All tracks by Brewer & Shipley except where noted

Side A
"Lady Like You"  – 2:12
"Rise Up (Easy Rider)"  – 3:15
"Boomerang"  – 2:18
"Indian Summer"  – 2:59
"All Along the Watchtower" (Bob Dylan) – 3:18

Side B
"People Love Each Other"  – 2:55
"Pig's Head"  – 2:10
"Oh, Sweet Lady"  – 2:00
"Too Soon Tomorrow"  – 2:52
"Witchi-Tai-To" (Jim Pepper)  – 6:57

Personnel
Mike Brewer – vocals, guitars, shakers, Vibra-slap
Tom Shipley – vocals, guitars
Mike Bloomfield – electric guitar
Fred Olson – electric guitar
Mark Naftalin – piano, organ
Ira Kamin – piano, organ
John Kahn – bass
Robert Huberman – bass
Bob Jones – drums
Orville 'Red' Rhodes – pedal steel guitar
Richard Greene – fiddle
AppleJack – harmonica
Rienol Andino – congas
Nicky Hopkins – piano
Technical
Leo De Gar Kulka - engineer
Vance Frost - assistant engineer, engineer

References

Brewer & Shipley albums
1969 albums
Albums produced by Nick Gravenites
Kama Sutra Records albums